St Andrew's Church is a former parish church of the Church of Ireland that is located in St Andrew's Street, Dublin, Ireland. After ceasing to be a church, it housed the main Dublin tourist office of Fáilte Ireland until 2014, and later underwent redevelopment with a view to reopening as a food hall. Vanessa, former pupil of Dean Swift, is buried at this church. The statue of Molly Malone has stood outside the building since mid-2014.

The church
The original St Andrew's Church was located on present-day Dame Street, but disappeared during Oliver Cromwell's reign in the mid-17th century. A new church was built in 1665 a little further away from the city walls, on an old bowling-green close to the Thingmote, the old assembly-place of the Norse rulers of the city. Due to its shape, it was commonly known as the "Round Church". Local landlords of the time, Lord Anglesey (after whom Anglesea Street is named) and Sir John Temple (after whose family Temple Bar is named) were churchwardens. The architect was William Dodson. The neighbouring houses were located in that part of the Dublin Corporation estate known as "the Whole Land of Tib and Tom".

The church was rebuilt in 1793, but burnt down in 1860, when the present building was constructed.

Memorials
Vanessa, former pupil of Jonathan Swift, was buried in St. Andrew's Church in June 1723.

Thomas Dalton, Lord Chancellor of Ireland, was buried here in 1730

Marmaduke Coghill, member of Parliament for Dublin University, judge of the Prerogative Court and Chancellor of the Exchequer was buried in the family vault in this church in 1738.

The cemetery
 The Italian violinist and composer Francesco Geminiani was buried in this churchyard in September 1762. His remains were disinterred in 1929 and reburied in San Francesco, Lucca, the town of his birth.
 Alderman Thomas Pleasants, father of Thomas Pleasants the developer and philanthropist, was buried in the church-yard of this church in 1729.
 The surgeon Philip Woodroffe is buried in St Andrew's churchyard.

The parish

The boundaries of the ecclesiastical parish were coextensive to those of the civil parish of St Andrew. The population of this parish in 1901 was 3,058, in 1971 it was 300.

References and sources
Notes

Sources

George Newenham Wright An Historical Guide to the City of Dublin
Craig, Maurice (1969). Dublin: 1660-1860. Dublin: Allen Figgis.
Usher, Robin (2008). 'Reading Architecture: St. Andrew's Church, Dublin, 1670-1990', Visual Resources, vol. 24, no. 2, pp. 119–32.

Tourist attractions in Dublin (city)
Church of Ireland churches in Dublin (city)